Sungai Dua is a residential neighbourhood within the city of George Town in Penang, Malaysia.

Etymology 
Sungai Dua is named after an eponymous river, Sungai Dua, which runs through the area.

History 
Formerly an agricultural area, Sungai Dua was first developed as a residential neighbourhood in the 1970s, following the establishment of the adjacent Universiti Sains Malaysia. Beginning in the 1980s, high-rises, such as apartments and flats, were constructed within the neighbourhood to cater to the influx of university students.

Transportation 
Jalan Sungai Dua is the main thoroughfare within the neighbourhood, which is also served by Rapid Penang bus routes 301, 303, 304 and 308.

Education 

Universiti Sains Malaysia (USM), Penang's premier public university, is situated immediately north of Sungai Dua. One of the top Malaysian public universities, USM was ranked fifth within the country by the QS World University Rankings .

In addition, a primary school and a high school are situated within Sungai Dua. Notably, Phor Tay High School, which is situated in the area, is the sole public Buddhist school in Malaysia.

Primary school
 SRJK (C) Keong Hoe
High school
 Phor Tay High School

Shopping 
A Lotus's hypermarket within the neighbourhood was completed in the late 2000s to cater to the retail needs of the community. In addition, Suiwah Corporation, a local retail firm, operates the Sunshine Lip Sin supermarket within the area.

Neighbourhood
Taman Lip Sin
Taman Pekaka

See also 
 Minden Heights
 Gelugor

References 

Neighbourhoods in George Town, Penang